Rubus allegheniensis is a North American species of highbush blackberry in section Alleghenienses of the genus Rubus, a member of the rose family. It is the most common and widespread highbush blackberry in eastern and central North America. It is commonly known as Allegheny blackberry.

Description
The characteristics of Rubus allegheniensis can be highly variable. The leaves are alternate, compound, ovoid, and have toothed edges.

Canes have many prickles, with white, 5-petal,  flowers in late spring and glossy, deep-violet to black, aggregate fruit in late summer. It is shade intolerant.

Distribution and habitat
R. allegheniensis is very common in eastern and central North America. It is also naturalized in a few locations in California and British Columbia.

The presence of the species influences the dynamics of the understory vegetation of many forests in the eastern United States. An abundance of R. allegheniensis encourages new tree seedlings. Where the effects of herbivorous animals (such as deer) reduce the abundance of Allegheny blackberry, a competitor, Dennstaedtia punctilobula (hay-scented fern), takes over. Where D. punctilobula becomes common, the growth of tree seedlings is restricted.

Concentrations of R. allegheniensis increase greatly after events that destroy taller shrubs and trees and thus permit more light into the understory, such as fires or widespread blowdown. These populations often decline in later years as the tree seedlings sheltered by the blackberry canes grow and reduce the amount of light reaching the lower levels.

Uses
The berries are edible and nutritious. People eat them raw and cook them into various treats, including pies, cobblers, muffins, jellies, and jams.

Ecology
Many mammals eat the fruit, including elk, foxes, bears, rabbits, raccoons, opossums, squirrels, mice, and chipmunks, and deer will browse the young canes. Blackberries are also an important food source for many species of birds. The mammals and birds that eat the fruit then disperse the seed in their droppings, enabling the plant to spread to new locations. A wide variety of native bees, butterflies, beetles, flies, ants, wasps, and other insects are attracted to the nectar and pollen of the flowers, and caterpillars, grasshoppers, beetles eat the leaves. Birds and small mammals use the thickets formed by the canes for shelter.

References

External links
 United States Department of Agriculture plants profile for Rubus allegheniensis
 photo of herbarium specimen at Missouri Botanical Garden, collected in Missouri in 1992
 
 
 
 

allegheniensis
Berries
Flora of North America
Plants described in 1890